Cinna may refer to:
 Cornelii Cinnae, an ancient Roman family
 Lucius Cornelius Cinna, Roman consul four consecutive times in the 80s BC and at the time of his death the father-in-law of Julius Caesar
 Gnaeus Cornelius Cinna Magnus, a conspirator against the emperor Augustus, and the subject of Corneille's tragedy Cinna
 Cinna (Galatia), a town of ancient Galatia, now in Turkey
 Cinna (plant), a genus of grasses
 Cinna (play), a tragedy by Pierre Corneille
 Cinna, character in The Hunger Games trilogy
 German Shepherd, a variation of which is called Cinna
 Cinna (horse)
 Helvius Cinna, a Roman poet